Jason Desmond Anthony Brooke FRAS (born 22 April 1985) is the grandson of the last Rajah Muda of Sarawak, Anthony Walter Dayrell Brooke, and a prominent representative of the Brooke Dynasty in Sarawak.

Background
Born in London, Brooke grew up there, in Edinburgh and the east coast of Ireland, reading English Literature at University College Dublin, and earning an MPhil International Relations from Trinity College, Dublin. A keen rower, Brooke served as Captain of the Boats, University College Dublin Boat Club, for 2007/2008.

In 2011 he was elected a Fellow of the Royal Asiatic Society. He is President of the Sarawak Association, founded by his great-grandfather Bertram, Tuan Muda of Sarawak in 1924. He is a member of the Borneo Research Council and has served on the Council of the British Malaysian Society. He is best-known for his role as a prominent representative of the Brooke Dynasty, and as Director of the UK charity, the Brooke Trust.

In 2011, Brooke sought on behalf of his family a formal exoneration from the British Government for his grandfather, over allegations Anthony Brooke had been complicit in the assassination of Duncan Stewart, the Governor of Sarawak, in 1949. The release of previously missing records clearing Anthony's name led to a BBC Radio 4 documentary aired in March 2011, just weeks after Anthony's death. In 2013, Brooke brought his grandfather's ashes to Sarawak for burial following a large public memorial service. The Acting British High Commissioner to Malaysia attended and offered an apology on behalf of Great Britain, clearing Anthony Brooke's name of any involvement.

Through the Brooke Trust, he has promoted an appreciation of Sarawak's heritage, first arranging for the digitisation of the Papers of the Brookes of Sarawak in 2012 and making these freely available online.

In 2012, it was announced that Brooke, through the Brooke Trust, would champion a new Brooke Gallery to be housed in Fort Margherita in Kuching, a project which was realised on 24 September 2016, the 175th anniversary of the founding of the State of Sarawak.

Brooke has been responsible for signing important memoranda with the Sarawak State Library in Kuching, the Sarawak State Museum, and local communities. In September 2016 he was appointed a technical advisor on a then-upcoming feature film on the life of his ancestor, Sir James Brooke, Rajah of Sarawak. The film, titled Edge of the World, was released in 2021. He currently divides his time between London and Sarawak.

References

External links
Brooke Heritage Trust Official Website

1985 births
Living people
Alumni of Trinity College Dublin
Jason Brooke
Pretenders